Juanita Odessa Jones Abernathy (December 1, 1931 – September 12, 2019) was an American civil rights activist, and the wife of Ralph Abernathy.

Life

Juanita Odessa Jones was born in Uniontown, Alabama. She studied at Selma University and after it attended Tennessee State University from which she later graduated as well. She worked as a teacher, and worked for Mary Kay Cosmetics. She also served on the Board of Trustees for the Morehouse School of Religion, and on the board of directors for the Atlanta Fulton County League of Women Voters and the Metropolitan Atlanta Rapid Transit Authority.

She was a part of the team that organized the Montgomery bus boycott of December 1955 - December 1956.
In 1957, her home was bombed. In 1965 she walked in the Selma to Montgomery March.

In 2013, she was honored by the Atlanta City Council with a proclamation.

Family
She married Ralph Abernathy on August 31, 1952. Together they had five children: Ralph David Abernathy Jr., Juandalynn Ralpheda, Donzaleigh Avis, Ralph David Abernathy III, and Kwame Luthuli Abernathy. Their first child, Ralph Abernathy Jr., died suddenly on August 18, 1953, less than 2 days after his birth on August 16, while their other children lived on to adulthood.

References

1931 births
2019 deaths
African-American activists
Activists for African-American civil rights
American civil rights activists
People from Uniontown, Alabama
Selma University alumni
Tennessee State University alumni
21st-century African-American people
Members of the League of Women Voters
American civil rights activists (civil rights movement)